The 2015–16 Querétaro F.C. season was the club's 66th season of existence, and their 15th season in the top tier of Mexican football. Querétaro competed in Liga MX and the CONCACAF Champions League.

Roster

Competitions

Liga MX

Apertura

Clausura

CONCACAF Champions League

Group stage

Quarterfinals

Semifinals

References 

Queretaro
Querétaro F.C.
Queretaro
Querétaro F.C. seasons